Roland Utbult (born 24 May 1951) is a Swedish politician and musician. Prior to entering politics, Utbult had a successful musical career in the Christian genre of Swedish music. He is a politician serving Kristdemokraterna in the Swedish Riksdag using his musical ability in his service as a politician before the parliament. Along with other influential Christian musicians, Utbult appeared on the Swedish version of Gaither Homecoming "Minns du sången," a show much appreciated by many Swedish Christians.

Politics
He was originally active in Folkpartiet, the Swedish liberal party during his time in politics. However, certain party positions are considered as being incompatible with Utbult's Christian faith. In the 2010 elections Utbult ran, and was elected, as a candidate for the more conservative Kristdemokraterna party and has been a member of the Swedish parliament since that year.

References

1951 births
Living people
20th-century Swedish male singers
Liberals (Sweden) politicians
People from Öckerö Municipality
21st-century Swedish politicians
Members of the Riksdag from the Christian Democrats (Sweden)
Members of the Riksdag 2010–2014
Members of the Riksdag 2014–2018
Members of the Riksdag 2018–2022
Members of the Riksdag 2022–2026